Thunder Horse PDQ is a BP plc and ExxonMobil joint venture semi-submersible oil platform on location over the Mississippi Canyon Thunder Horse oil field (Block 778/822), in deepwater Gulf of Mexico,  southeast of New Orleans, moored in waters of . The "PDQ" identifies the platform as being a Production and oil Drilling facility with crew Quarters.

Thunder Horse PDQ is the largest offshore installation of its kind in the world. The vessel's hull is of GVA design. The hull was built by Daewoo Shipbuilding & Marine Engineering (DSME) in Okpo, South Korea, then loaded aboard the heavy lift ship  and transported to Kiewit Offshore Services in Ingleside, Texas, where it was integrated with its topsides modules that were built in Morgan City, La.  The  journey around the Cape of Good Hope took nine weeks (63 days), from 23 July to 23 September 2004.

Hurricane Dennis

Thunder Horse PDQ was evacuated with the approach of Hurricane Dennis in July 2005. After the hurricane passed, the platform fell into a 30 degree list and was in danger of foundering.

The platform was designed for a 100-year event, and inspection teams found no hull damage and no leaks through its hull. Rather, an incorrectly plumbed 6-inch length of pipe allowed water to flow freely among several ballast tanks that set forth a chain of events causing the platform to tip into the water.  The platform was fully righted about a week after Dennis,  delaying commercial production initially scheduled for late 2005. During repairs, it was discovered that the underwater manifold was severely cracked due to poorly welded pipes.

The platform took a nearly-direct hit six weeks later from Hurricane Katrina, but was undamaged.

See also
Offshore oil and gas in the US Gulf of Mexico
Oil fields operated by BP

References

External links
 
 Thunder Horse Project images, maps and diagrams  at SubSeaIQ
 
 Thunder Horse BP's deepwater drilling platform

2005 ships
Drilling rigs
Maritime incidents in 2005
Oil platforms off the United States
Semi-submersibles
Ships built by Daewoo Shipbuilding & Marine Engineering
Ships of BP
Ships of ExxonMobil